Gunawati is a village in Makrana tehsil in Kuchaman City district of Rajasthan, India.

It is located in the Kuchaman City, approximately 120 km west of Jaipur and 1.5 km far from Makrana
Gunawati was established by Jorawar Singh Rathore the father of Sarv Shree Rathore. There are Three Rajput koldis. It was the territory of Mertiya Rathore (akkhe singhot)

Here is the temple of a historical turapni mata. Which is the center of faith of thousands of devotees.
Here many people have worked as great army men.Captain Ladhoo Singh Ji Rathore fought for India in Indo-Pak war of 1971. He was awarded by the then president of India and has also been mentioned in the 'Mention of Dispatches' and the 'Gazette of India'. Gunawati has many white marble mines and factories.

History 
Gunawati was founded in 1706 CE (Vikram Samvat 1763) by Sarv Shri Singh, the son of Joravar Singh. It was named after Birbal's sister Gunwati.

Economy 

Farming is the main occupation for the most of Jakhal residents. The main crops in the monsoon seasons are Bajara (Pearl Millet), Moth and Gwar. The main crops in the winter months are Wheat, Barley, Mustard Seed and Chana (Chickpeas).

Several of the villagers have served in the Indian Army. Shree Simarath Singh was martyred in 1971 Indo-Pak war.

Geography

Demographics

 India census, Gunawati had a population of 1,222. Males constitute 638 of the population and females 584.

References

External links 

Villages in Nagaur district